The Humber Armoured Car was one of the most widely produced British armoured cars of the Second World War. It supplemented the Humber Light Reconnaissance Car and remained in service until the end of the war.

Development

The Guy company did not have sufficient production capacity to produce sufficient Guy Armoured Cars as well as other vehicles, so shortly after war broke out the Rootes Group were approached to produce an armoured car – at the time the terminology "Tank, Light (Wheeled)" was used by the Army. Working from the Guy design, Karrier designed a vehicle using as a basis their KT 4 artillery tractor chassis (already in production for the Indian Army) and the armoured body of the Guy Armoured Car. Karrier moved the KT4 engine to the rear and fitted welded bodies and turrets provided by Guy. As it had been based on proven elements, trials of prototypes passed without serious issues and an order for 500 was placed in 1940 and first deliveries made in 1941.

The Karrier name was dropped to avoid confusion with the British Universal Carrier tracked vehicle and the vehicles were designated "Armoured Car, Humber Mk 1" using the name of Humber Limited (another member of the Rootes Group) though production was by Karrier at the Luton works of Commer (yet another Rootes company).

The first Humbers were more or less identical to the Guy down to the faults in the armour, but this was later rectified.

The Mark III improved upon the Mark II by providing a three-man turret. Mark III production ended in 1942 after 1,650 had been built. With a possible replacement, the 2-pounder armed Coventry armoured car, on its way, the Mark IV was designed. This put the US 37 mm gun in the turret but at the cost of one crewman.  The Coventry was not ordered as a replacement and so production of Mark IV continued, for a total of 2,000, despite its flaws.

Design
The Humber was a rectangular chassis frame with a rear mounted engine. The gearbox was mounted to the front of the engine; it fed a centrally mounted transfer box which distributed power to front and rear differentials. The rigid axles were mounted on leaf springs front and rear with hydraulic dampers. The welded armoured hull was mounted at four points - front, rear and sides - to give some flexibility but with precautions against excessive movement of the hull on the chassis.

For forward vision the driver had a flap in the front of the "cab" (which became part of the glacis from the Mark II onwards). When shut the view he was protected by a Triplex bullet proof glass block. These could be readily replaced if damaged. There were other flaps to the sides. In order to see to the rear there was a combination of a flap in the rear bulkhead between the fighting compartment and engine bay and a mechanism that raised the engine cover.

The turret, armed with one 15mm and one 7.92mm Besa machine guns, was hand traversed. The vehicle commander acted as the wireless operator.

Service history
The vehicle was used in the North African Campaign from late 1941 by the 11th Hussars and other units. It was also widely used in the European theatre by reconnaissance regiments of British and Canadian infantry divisions. A few vehicles were used for patrol duty along the Iran supply route. A British Indian Army armoured car regiment, partly equipped with Humbers, served in the reconquest of Burma. Portugal received a number of Humber vehicles in 1943, most of them going to the Army, but with 20 going to the National Republican Guard. After the Second World War, the Humber was employed by Egypt in 1948–49 as well as by Burma, Ceylon, Cyprus, Denmark, India, Mexico and the Netherlands.

The Humber armoured car was used in Burma Campaign by the 16th Light Cavalry, an Indian armoured car regiment, which formed part of Fourteenth Army troops.

After Independence, an Indian Army regiment, 63rd Cavalry, was raised with Humber Mk IV armoured cars as one of its squadrons which was later hived off as an independent reconnaissance squadron and the integral squadron re-raised, the second time with Daimlers.  The Humbers and Daimlers of the Indian Army formed the mounts of the President's Bodyguard and were deployed in the defense of Chushul at heights above 14,000 ft during the 1962 Indo-China War. The Humber was used against the Indian Army in 1948 by the 2nd and 4th Hyderabad Lancers, armoured car cavalry units of the Hyderabad State Forces, during Operation Polo.

Humber armoured cars were employed during the Indian invasion of Goa in December 1961. These vehicles equipped the four reconnaissance squadrons of the Portuguese garrison in Goa. The Portuguese Humbers engaged the invading Indian forces in the brief fights that occurred in the border villages of Doromagogo, Malinguém and Polem, and in the break through the Indian troops surrounding the Portuguese forces in Mapusa.

Survivors

Several static and operational cars are distributed through North America and Europe. The Tank Museum, Bovington, England has an original and sole survivor Guy Wheeled Tank on display and a Humber Mk II not currently on display. A Mk IV is on display at the Australian Armour and Artillery Museum in Cairns, Australia. A Portuguese car is on display at the Museu do Combatente in Belém.

Variants

Mark I
Original version, hull as the Guy Armoured Car Mark 1A. Armed with one 15 mm and one 7.92 mm calibre Besa machine guns. Three man crew: driver, gunner, commander. About 300 units built.
Mark II
Changes to the turret, better armour around driver and radiator. 440 units built.
Mark II OP
Observation post vehicle fitted for communication with field artillery batteries, armed with two 7.92 mm BESA machine guns
Mark III
Larger three-man turret with provisions for a wireless operator freeing up the wireless operation tasks of the commander.
Mark III "Rear Link" 
gun replaced with dummy to allow installation of Wireless No. 19 High Power (ie amplified) and its generator. Issued two per regiment for communication between Brigade and Divisional headquarters.
Mark IV
Equipped with the US M5 or M6 37 mm high velocity gun in place of the 15 mm BESA. The larger gun required the removal of the third crewman in the turret (the wireless operator). Turret hatches were rearranged with the new gun and crew layout. About 2,000 units built.
AA Mark I
The Mark I fitted with a different turret (by Stothert & Pitt) mounting four 7.92 mm BESA machine guns able to elevate to near vertical and an AA sight. Introduced in 1943, the vehicle was intended to provide anti-aircraft support for armoured car units (at a rate of one troop of four cars per regiment), but the Allied air superiority meant they were needed less and less as the war progressed and the troops were disbanded in 1944. A twin 15mm Besa version was also made.

Former operators

Second World War

Post-War

See also
Fox Armoured Car – a Canadian vehicle based on the Humber Mk III

References

Sources 
 George Forty (1996), World War Two Armoured Fighting Vehicles and Self-Propelled Artillery, Osprey Publishing, .
 I. Moschanskiy, Bronekollektsiya, 1999, no. 02 (Armored vehicles of the Great Britain 1939–1945 part 2), Modelist-Konstruktor. (И. Мощанский – Бронетанковая техника Великобритании 1939–1945 часть 2, Моделист-Конструктор, Бронеколлекция 1999–02)
Humber Mark IV/Fox Mark II Armoured Car Warwheels.net

External links 

 World War II vehicles
 Armyvehicles.dk
 Photo galleries at Tanxheaven.com (Mk IV): , .
 Dutch Cavalry Museum has two Humber Armoured Cars and the Humber Light Reconnaissance Car in its exposition.

World War II armoured cars
World War II armoured fighting vehicles of the United Kingdom
Reconnaissance vehicles
Armoured car
Armoured cars of the United Kingdom
Military vehicles introduced from 1940 to 1944